The 2012 World Series of Poker was the 43rd annual World Series of Poker (WSOP). It was held at the Rio All Suite Hotel and Casino in Paradise, Nevada between May 27 – July 16, 2012, with the final table of the Main Event delayed until late October.

There were 61 bracelet events, culminating in the $10,000 No Limit Hold'em Main Event beginning on July 7. From 2008 through 2011, Main Event final tables were delayed until November. However, due to the 2012 U.S. presidential election, this year's final table was delayed until October 29, with heads-up play commencing the following day.

New tournament formats introduced in the 2012 WSOP included a re-entry tournament, an ante only tournament, a mixed max tournament (in which the number of players per table changes at set times during the tournament), and a four-handed tournament.

Event schedule

Event 55: The Big One for One Drop

The 2012 WSOP also hosted an event with the largest buy-in in poker history, a $1 million tournament benefiting the One Drop Foundation. The WSOP waived its normal 10% rake of the entry fees, and 11.1% of each buy-in (precisely $111,111) went to the foundation. All 48 seats available for the event were filled, resulting in a first prize of $18.3 million, breaking the record of $12 million won by Jamie Gold at the 2006 WSOP.  One Drop initially received US$5.44 million, including a 49th/personal $111,111 donation from Caesars Interactive Entertainment CEO Mitch Garber, who was ineligible to play because of his role with the company.  Guy Laliberté, the founder of the One Drop Foundation, finished in fifth place; he donated his entire winnings of US$1,834,666 to the foundation, for a total donation of US$7.28 million from this single tournament game.

Results

Main Event
The $10,000 No Limit Hold'em Main Event began on July 7. In a change from previous years, which featured four starting days, there were only three starting days at this year's event. The players from days 1A and 1B then played on days 2A and 2B, which were held the same day in separate rooms, while the players from Day 1C played on Day 2C. After reaching the final table of nine players on July 16, the remainder of the tournament was delayed until October 29.

The Main Event attracted 6,598 entrants, creating a prize pool of $62,021,200. The top 666 finishers placed in the money, with the top nine players guaranteed at least $754,798. The winner earned $8,531,853.

Two women almost made the final table. Norwegian Elisabeth Hille finished at 11th place while Gaelle Baumann finished in tenth place.  Her finish marked the best performance by a woman at the Main Event since Barbara Enright finished fifth in 1995 (Annie Duke finished tenth in 2000, but the total number of tournament entrants was lower).

Performance of past champions
 * Indicates a player who finished in the money

Other notable high finishes
NB: This list is restricted to top 30 finishers with an existing Wikipedia entry.

November Nine
*Career statistics prior to the beginning of the 2012 Main Event.

Final Table

Coverage
Televised coverage of the 2012 World Series of Poker could be found on ESPN. On Tuesday nights from July 3 through October 30, episodes of the WSOP would air on ESPN, with two one-hour episodes airing each week. The prior year, the WSOP Main Event was aired with near-live coverage on a brief delay, but that near-live coverage was done away with for the 2012 WSOP. In addition to the 2012 WSOP Main Event coverage on ESPN, the $1 million buy-in Big One for One Drop aired on a 15-minute delay on ESPN and ESPN3 on July 3 during a five-hour time slot. On July 31, an edited two-hour show of the Big One for One Drop aired. On August 7, the WSOP National Championship was on offer, then coverage of the WSOP Main Event started on August 14. The 2012 WSOP bracelet event broadcasts are archived in the on-demand section of PokerGO.com.

The final table of the 2012 WSOP Main Event aired on a 15-minute delay on Monday, October 29, on ESPN2 and ESPN3 and on Tuesday, October 30, on ESPN and ESPN3. Lon McEachern, Norman Chad, Antonio Esfandiari, and Kara Scott were the on-air talent and the event was produced by Poker PROductions, headed by Mori Eskandani. The 2012 WSOP Main Event broadcasts are archived in the on-demand section of PokerGO.com.

Live reporting coverage of the 2012 World Series of Poker was provided by PokerNews.com. PokerNews provided hand histories, chip counts, results, photographs, podcasts, videos, interviews, and more from the 2012 WSOP.

References

External links
Official site

World Series of Poker
World Series of Poker